Diospyros mollis is a tree in the family Ebenaceae, native to Southeast Asia. It is known as makleua in Thai.

References

mollis
Flora of Indo-China
Plants described in 1844